BRZ may refer to:

 Business Revitalization Zone, an area within which businesses pay an additional tax to fund improvements within the district's boundaries
 Subaru BRZ, a sports car

brz is the ISO 639-3 code of the Bilibil language